Candace Kane's Candy Factory is an action-puzzle video game for Microsoft Windows, Nintendo DS and Wii. The game lets players take the role of a factory-manager working for Candace or Colin Kane, two hard working and friendly candy makers, to fix up the factory in order to make their way to the Candy Cup Championships. During the game the machines break which are equivalent to challenges.

2008 video games
Action video games
Nintendo DS games
North America-exclusive video games
Puzzle video games
Video games about food and drink
Video games developed in the United States
Video games featuring female protagonists
Wii games
Windows games
Multiplayer and single-player video games